Margaret Emily Wheeler (née Jakobson) is an American actress. She is best known for her role as Janice on the television sitcom Friends (1994–2004), and Anita on Ellen (1994–1996).

Early life
Wheeler was born Margaret Emily Jakobson in New York City, the daughter of Barbara, a writer, and John Jakobson, who began his career on Wall Street as one of the youngest members of the New York Stock Exchange. She was raised in a secular Jewish household and graduated from The Calhoun School in New York City.

Career
In the 1980s, Wheeler (under her maiden name of Jakobson) briefly dabbled in voice acting on the animated series SilverHawks, where she provided all the female voices, specifically the villainess Melodia and the heroine Steelheart/Emily Hart, and on the Karate Kat and Mini-Monsters segments of The Comic Strip. She also starred in the 1989 film, New Year's Day, alongside David Duchovny.

After she became Maggie Wheeler, there has been a rumor that she auditioned for the role of Monica Geller in the series Friends. However, she denied this in an interview, stating that she only auditioned for the role of Janice Goralnik, which she was invited to play. Janice was a recurring character of the series and particularly known as a frequent love interest of main character Chandler Bing. She appeared at least once in each season; her 19 episodes tie her with Christina Pickles for Friends’ third most frequent guest actor, behind only Elliott Gould's 20 episodes, and James Michael Tyler's 150 episodes.

She also auditioned for the role of Debra Barone, on the American sitcom Everybody Loves Raymond. Although she was the producers' choice, CBS ended up selecting Patricia Heaton. Instead, Wheeler played the recurring role of Debra's friend, Linda.

According to Kathy Griffin's autobiography, Official Book Club Selection, Wheeler was cast in the role of Vicki for the pilot episode of Suddenly Susan and was later replaced by Griffin.

She had a star billing in the first season of Ellen. She appeared on the hit comedy Seinfeld in the episode "The Fix-Up", as one of Elaine's friends who is set up with George. She has appeared in many other television programs, including Drake & Josh, ER, The X-Files, The War at Home, Will & Grace, Jack and Jill, How I Met Your Mother and Curb Your Enthusiasm.

In 1997, Wheeler voiced Harley Quinn's replacement in the Batman: The Animated Series episode "Joker's Millions".

In 1998, she appeared in the remake of Disney's The Parent Trap, playing the younger of a mother-daughter pair of camp counselors. Wheeler provided the voice of Odile in Barbie of Swan Lake, and Trinette in the animated sitcom Archer.

In 2011, she guest-starred in the Disney Channel series Shake It Up as Dina's mother.

Personal life 
She has been married to sculptor Daniel Borden Wheeler since 1990.

Filmography

References

External links

Maggie Wheeler at filmreference.com
Maggie Wheeler on Facebook

Living people
Actresses from New York City
American Jews
American film actresses
American television actresses
American voice actresses
People from Manhattan
20th-century American actresses
21st-century American actresses
Year of birth missing (living people)